Michele Irmiter Elliott OBE is an author, psychologist, teacher and the founder and director of child protection charity Kidscape. She has chaired World Health Organization and Home Office working groups and is a Winston Churchill fellow.

Early life
Elliott was born on 7 January 1946 to James Irmiter and Ivy (née Dashwood). She graduated from Dixie Hollins High School in 1964. She attended the University of South Florida and the University of Florida, gaining a BA in Science and Education and a Masters's degree in Psychology She began working with families and children in 1968 in London.

Work
Elliott worked as a child psychologist at The American School in London, where her husband was a social studies teacher.

Kidscape
Elliott founded Kidscape in 1984 to help children stay safe from sexual abuse and from bullying.

Elliott has been a high-profile figure and Kidscape was named Charity of the Year in 2000. Writing in The Guardian, David Brindle suggested the award was "an undoubted reflection of the vibrancy of Michele Elliott".

Female child sexual abuse offenders
Elliott, who had previously written books about male abuse of children, has undertaken pioneering work in investigating and raising awareness of the problem and extent of child sexual abuse committed by women, and the topic of female paedophilia, publishing the book Female Sexual Abuse of Children The Last Taboo in 1992. The book was well received by professionals and survivors' organisations. Mike Lew described it as "an important and challenging work", helping "to forge a new understanding of the issues". Doody's annual stated it was "an extremely valuable book for all professionals, and it greatly increases the current state of knowledge, or lack of that knowledge, that can have a profound influence on the survivor's development and recovery".

Elliott's work in exposing the issue of child sexual abuse committed by women has also resulted in hostility from feminists.
While compiling Female Sexual Abuse of Children, Elliott organised a conference in London concerning sexual abuse by women. After publishing the book, Elliott was subject to a "deluge" of hate mail from feminists.

Awards
In 2008 Elliot was honoured with an OBE by the Queen for services to children. The following year she was named Children and Young People's Champion. She was awarded an honorary doctorate by Post University in 1998 and another honorary doctorate by the University of Birmingham in 2003.
She was awarded a Winston Churchill Fellowship in 1996. Her book, "Bullies, Cyberbullies and Frenemies" received the Literary Classics Gold Award in 2013.

Personal life
Elliot is married to Edward; they have two sons and 3 grandchildren. She lives in Rye, East Sussex.

Publications
 Keeping Safe: A Practical Guide to Talking with Children by Michele Elliott and Alice Englander, 1986, NCVO Publications, 
 The Willow Street Kids: It's Your Right to be Safe by Michele Elliott, 1986, Andre Deutsch Ltd 
 The Willow Street Kids: Be Smart Stay Safe by Michele Elliott, 1987, Piccolo Books 
 Feeling Happy, Feeling Safe by Michele Elliott, 1991, Hodder Children's Books, 
 Female Sexual Abuse Of Children: The Ultimate Taboo by Michele Elliott, 1994, Guilford Press 
 Keeping Safe by Phil Collins and Michele Elliott, 1994, Hodder & Stoughton Ltd 
 Teenscape: Personal Safety Programme for Teenagers by Michele Elliott, 1995, Health Education Authority 
 501 Ways to be a Good Parent by Michele Elliott, 1996, Hodder Mobius 
 101 Ways to Deal with Bullying: A Guide for Parents by Michele Elliott, 1997, Hodder Mobius, 
 The Willow Street Kids: Be Smart Stay Safe by Michele Elliott, 1997, Macmillan Children's Books, 
 The Willow Street Kids: Beat the Bullies by Michele Elliott, 1997, Macmillan Children's Books, 
 601 Ways to Be a Good Parent: A Practical Handbook for Raising Children Ages Four to Twelve, by Michele Elliott, 1999, Citadel, 
 Bully-free: Activities to Promote Confidence and Friendship by Michele Elliott, Gaby Shenton and Roz Eirew, 1999, Kidscape 
 How to Stop Bullying by Michele Elliott and Jane Kirkpatrick, 2001, Kidscape 
 Bullying: A Practical Guide to Coping for Schools by Michele Elliott, 2002, Pearson Education, 
 Dealing with Bullying: Training Guide for Teachers of Children and Young People with Special Needs by Michele Elliott, Claude Knights, 2008, Kidscape 
 The Essential Guide to Tackling Bullying: Practical Skills for Teachers by Michele Elliott, 2011, Longman, 
 "Bullies, Cyberbullies and Frenemies", by Michele Elliott, 2013, Hodder, 
 "Stop Bullying Pocketbook", 2nd edition, by Michele Elliott, 2010, Teachers' Pocketbooks, 
 "PONLE UN ALTO AL BULLYING", by Michele Elliott, 2014, Educacion Aplicada, Mexico,

References

Child psychologists
Officers of the Order of the British Empire
Place of birth missing (living people)
American non-fiction writers
British non-fiction writers
Living people
1946 births
University of South Florida alumni
University of Florida alumni
People from St. Petersburg, Florida
Dixie Hollins High School alumni